The S3 is a railway service of RER Vaud that provides hourly service between  and  in the Swiss canton of Vaud. Swiss Federal Railways, the national railway company of Switzerland, operates the service.

Operations 
The S4 makes a limited number of stops between Lausanne and Aigle.

History 

The "first" S3 was one of the six original lines of the RER Vaud, then called the Vaud Express Network (REV), when that system was established in December 2004. With the December 2020 timetable change, the S3 was cut back to Lausanne, with the S5 taking over the Lausanne–Villeneuve service.

The RER Vaud lines were substantially reorganized for the December 2022 timetable change. The "new" S3 was a combination of the former S2 and S5, making local stops on the Simplon line between Vallorbe and Aigle, with limited service from Aigle to St-Maurice.

References

External links 

 2023 timetable: Vallorbe–Lausanne and Lausanne–St-Maurice

RER Vaud lines
Transport in the canton of Vaud